Eureka is an unincorporated community in Luce Township, Spencer County, in the U.S. state of Indiana.

History
Eureka was laid out in 1858. A post office was established at Eureka in 1872, and remained in operation until it was discontinued in 1921. Tradition has it the community was so named after a pioneer exclaimed "Eureka!" when he came upon the site.

Geography

Climate
The climate in this area is characterized by hot, humid summers and generally mild to cool winters.  According to the Köppen Climate Classification system, Eureka has a humid subtropical climate, abbreviated "Cfa" on climate maps.

References

Unincorporated communities in Spencer County, Indiana